Sid Makkar is a Mumbai born and raised actor. He has worked extensively in film, television and on stage both in the Hindi and English language.

Career
Sid started as an actor after studying at the University of Texas at Austin, U.S.A. He has worked in Indian, American, British and Australian films.
His works include the very successful John Madden directed 'The Best Exotic Marigold Hotel' with Judi Dench and Dev Patel ,the cult favourite 'Sense 8' Season 2 (Netflix) by the Wachowski's and the Australian film 'Save your Legs'.

Sid has played leading parts in Indian series like 'Spotlight', 'Six', and films like 'Hacked' and 'Turning 30' and been part of Zoya Akhtar's first film 'Luck by Chance'.
He played the protagonist, a detective in the 1850's, Mughal era series 'Dariba Diaries' and received much acclaim.

His love towards theatre has gravitated him towards playing the titular role in the hit Bollywood musical 'Zangoora'. He essayed the role of Gautama Buddha in Lushin Dubey's "Buddha"and worked on other dramatic plays like 'Where did I Leave my Purdah' directed by Lillette Dubey and "Art" directed by Mahabanoo Mody Kotwal and Kaizaad Kotwal.

Sid is currently working on various projects and divides his time between Mumbai, Goa and London.

Filmography

Films

Web series

Television

Theatre

References

External links

Living people
Indian male television actors
Indian male stage actors
Year of birth missing (living people)